Poonam Gupta OBE (born 1976) is an Indian entrepreneur, who emigrated to Scotland from India in 2002.

Early life
She completed her early schooling years in Delhi at Lady Irwin School and Delhi Public School where she got admission on merit to complete her high schooling. She went on to complete an Honours Degree in Economics from Shri Ram College of Commerce in Delhi before gaining an MBA in International Business and Marketing at FORE School of Management, Delhi and Maastricht School of Management in Holland. In 2022, Gupta was awarded a Ph.D. in International Business and Marketing at Ecole Supérieure Robert de Sorbon. She arrived in the west of Scotland after marrying Puneet Gupta, a Belfast-born pharmacist of Indian descent. Together they have two daughters. During her second pregnancy, Gupta suffered from a rare form of bone tuberculosis which necessitated her using a wheelchair for 18 months.

Career 
Poonam launched her first business PG Paper Company Ltd in 2003 from her family house in Kilmacolm, Scotland.

The business initially specialised in salvaging and reusing products that were often destined for landfill. PG Paper imports and exports goods from over 53 countries around the world and is considered to be the fastest growing paper companies in the United Kingdom.

Since 2015 the official headquarters were moved from the family home to the Custom House in Greenock, Scotland.

Gupta is now involved in several other business ventures including PG World, SAPP Holdings, SAPP International, SAPP Property, EnVisage Dental Health, Punav.

She has been recognised as one of the ‘100 Most Influential in UK-India Relations’ by India Inc Group.

Philanthropy 
Gupta's charitable contributions are focused on women's issues, underprivileged children, animal conservation, cancer, gender equality and helping young girls in India to get an education.

In 2015 and 2017, Gupta and her husband Puneet Gupta took part in a rickshaw race to raise funds for  Elephant Family, a charity that was founded by the conservationist and Duchess of Cornwall's brother, the late Mark Shand to conserve the Asian elephants.

In 2017, Gupta formed Women's Business Mentoring organization which aims to help Scottish women become successful by providing mentoring schemes across the country.

She contributed to the Virat Kohli Foundation when she placed the winning bid on a painting donated to the cause by the artist Sacha Jafri.

In 2021, Gupta led an India Covid Appeal, providing and delivering over 3,000 oxygen concentrators throughout India during the country's deadly second Covid wave.

Awards, honours and appointments

References 

1976 births
Living people
Businesspeople from Delhi
Indian emigrants to Scotland
Scottish women in business
Scottish philanthropists
Indian women philanthropists
Indian philanthropists
Naturalised citizens of the United Kingdom
Officers of the Order of the British Empire